{{DISPLAYTITLE:C30H48O4}}
The molecular formula C30H48O4 (molar mass: 472.70 g/mol, exact mass: 472.3553 u) may refer to:

 Corosolic acid
 Ganodermanontriol
 Hederagenin
 Maslinic acid

Molecular formulas